Alex Schibanoff (October 17, 1919 – November 27, 1995) was an American football offensive tackle and track and field athlete. 

A native of Freehold Township, New Jersey, Schibanoff attended Freehold High School and played college football at Franklin & Marshall College. He also set a Middle Atlantic records in the shot put and discus.

He also played professional football in the National Football League as a tackle for the Detroit Lions. He appeared in two games during the 1941 season and six games during the 1942 season. 

In April 1942, following the attack on Pearl Harbor, Schibanoff enlisted in the U.S. Naval Reserve. After the 1942 season, he was called to active duty in the Navy, serving as executive officer on a PT boat in the South Pacific.

Schibanoff later worked for Blue Cross/Blue Shield in Manhattan for more than 30 years. He died in 1995 in New Milford, Connecticut.

References

1919 births
1995 deaths
American football tackles
Franklin & Marshall Diplomats football players
Freehold High School alumni
Detroit Lions players
Players of American football from New Jersey
People from Freehold Township, New Jersey
Sportspeople from Monmouth County, New Jersey